Oldambtmeer is an artificial lake of more than 800 hectares (ha) in the municipality of Oldambt in the Netherlands, created by flooding fallow land that had previously been reclaimed.

References 

Bodies of water of Groningen (province)
Oldambt (municipality)